Daniel Johnson may refer to:

Politics
 Daniel Johnson (Rockland County, NY) (1790–1875), New York politician
 Daniel Harris Johnson (1825–1900), Wisconsin politician and judge
 Daniel D. Johnson (1836–1893), president of the West Virginia Senate
 Daniel A. Johnson (born 1942), American diplomat
 Daniel Johnson Sr. (1915–1968), leader of Union Nationale party (1961–1968) and Quebec premier
 Daniel Johnson Jr. (born 1944), leader of Quebec Liberal Party (1993–1998) and Quebec premier
 Daniel F. Johnson (1801–?), Michigan state representative
 Daniel Johnson (Michigan politician) (1821–1860), Michigan state senator
 Daniel Johnson (naval officer), recipient of Navy and Marine Corps Medal and candidate for Congress from North Carolina
 Daniel Johnson (Scottish politician) (born 1977), member of the Scottish Parliament

Sports
 Daniel Johnson (American football) (born 1955), American football player
 Daniel Johnson (baseball) (born 1995), major league baseball player
 Daniel Johnson (basketball) (born 1988), player for the Adelaide 36ers
 Daniel Johnson (footballer) (born 1992), player for Preston North End
 Daniel Johnson (soccer) (born 1995), American soccer player
 Shang Johnson (Daniel Spencil Johnson, 1898–?), American Negro leagues baseball player

Other
 Daniel Johnson (pirate) (1629–1675), English buccaneer
 Daniel Johnson (surgeon) (1767–1835), English surgeon in Bengal and writer
 C. Daniel Johnson, American radiologist
 Daniel L. Johnson (born 1946), Mexican leader in The Church of Jesus Christ of Latter-day Saints
 Daniel Johnson (journalist) (born 1957), British founding editor of Standpoint
 Daniel Johnson, bass guitarist for Canadian band Stereos

See also
 Daniel-Johnson dam, on the Manicouagan River in Quebec, Canada
 Dan Johnson (disambiguation)
 Daniel Johnston (disambiguation)